Naruki (written: 成樹, 成輝 or 尚瑠輝) is a masculine Japanese given name. Notable people with the name include:

, Japanese professional wrestler
, Japanese actor
, Japanese footballer
, Japanese baseball player

Japanese masculine given names